A by-election for the New South Wales Legislative Assembly seat of Sydney was held on Saturday 27 October 2012. The by-election was triggered by the resignation of independent MP Clover Moore due to the legislation preventing dual membership of state parliament and local council.

Following the 2012 local government elections in which Moore was re-elected for a third term as Lord Mayor of Sydney, Moore resigned from NSW Parliament. Laws passed through NSW Parliament in 2012 ceased dual state parliament and local council representation.

Alex Greenwich, an independent candidate backed by Moore easily won the seat.

Dates

Background
Moore was first elected to the marginal seat of Bligh at the 1988 election. Her largest primary vote was 43.7 percent in 1991, while her largest two-candidate preferred vote was 64.7 percent in 2003. The seat was replaced by Sydney at the 2007 election, where Moore retained the seat with a primary vote of 39.6 percent (+7.2) and a two-candidate preferred vote of 66.6 percent (+1.6) against . In two-party preferred terms, the seat had a Liberal vote of 65.5 percent (+22.4) against Labor.

There was a 16.3 percent two-party preferred swing away from the Coalition government at the 2011 Clarence by-election. The Coalition did not contest the 2012 Heffron by-election which Labor retained with an increased margin. Labor strategically chose not to contest the Sydney by-election.

Candidates
The five candidates in ballot paper order were as follows:

Polling
On 26 September 2012, 422 voters (5% MoE) in the seat were robocall polled by ReachTel. Greenwich was on a primary vote of 31.4 percent, the Liberals were on 30.6 percent, the Greens were on 25.4 percent, with 'others' on 12.5 percent (respondents were told Labor was not fielding a candidate). Although no two-candidate preferred vote was given, the ABC's election analyst Antony Green said Greenwich would have been favoured to win on preferences given that Labor decided not to run a candidate.

Results

Clover Moore resigned.

See also
 Electoral results for the district of Sydney
 Electoral results for the district of Bligh
 List of New South Wales state by-elections

References

2012 elections in Australia
New South Wales state by-elections
2010s in New South Wales